"What the World Needs" is a song recorded by American country music artist Wynonna.  It was released in May 2003 as the first single from her album What the World Needs Now Is Love.  The song was written by Brett James and Holly Lamar.

Personnel 
 Wynonna Judd – lead vocals
 Tim Akers – keyboards
 Matt Rollings – keyboards
 Tom Bukovac – electric guitar
 Gordon Kennedy – electric guitar
 John Willis – acoustic guitar, banjo
 Paul Franklin – steel guitar
 Steve Mackey – bass
 Steve Potts – drums
 Jonathan Yudkin – fiddle
 Lisa Cochran – backing vocals
 Chris Rodriguez – backing vocals

Chart performance
"What the World Needs" debuted at number 55 on the U.S. Billboard Hot Country Songs chart for the week of May 10, 2003.

Year-end charts

References

2003 singles
Wynonna Judd songs
Songs written by Brett James
Songs written by Holly Lamar
Song recordings produced by Dann Huff
Asylum Records singles
Curb Records singles
2003 songs